= Folkestone Vikings =

American football team based in the UK

- Founded: 1986; 39 years ago
- League: British National Gridiron League
- Conference: South East
- Division: Premier Division
- Location: Folkestone, Kent
- Stadium: Folkestone, Kent
- Division titles: 2 (1991, 1992)

The Folkestone Vikings were an American football team based in Folkestone, Kent. First formed in 1986, they last played in the South East Conference of the British National Gridiron League Premier Division.

== History ==
The team was originally formed in 1986 as the Thanet Vikings and competed in the Budweiser League's Central Division 2.

Having already played fixtures in the city of Canterbury, the team made Canterbury Rugby Club its home ahead of the 1988 season and was renamed as the Canterbury Vikings.

== Season records ==
Season	League	Division	Region	Regular Season Record					Post Season	Notes
Season	League	Division	Region	Wins	Losses	Ties	PF	PA	Post Season	Notes
1986	Budweiser League	2	Central	4	6	0	175	272	–	–
1987	Budweiser League	1	South Eastern	4	6	0	187	248	–	–
1988	Budweiser League	1	South Eastern	5	4	1	106	238	–	–
1989	BNGL	Premier	Southern B	3	5	0	150	202	–	–
1990	BNGL	Premier	South East	1	8	1	19	237	–	–
1991	BNGL	First	South East	9	1	0	267	52	Won Horsham Predators 12-6 Quarter-Finals; Lost Basildon Chiefs 36-8 Semi Finals	Division Champions
1992	BNGL	Premier	South East	8	2	0	203	136	Lost Crawley Raiders 12-25 Quarter Finals	Division Champions
Total				34	32	2	1,107	1,385	All-time Regular Season Record	
